The Hokkaidō deciduous forests ecoregion (WWF ID: PA0423) covers the northern and southern coasts of the island of Hokkaido, the northernmost of the main islands of Japan.  The region sits in the transition zone between the colder subarctic forests to the north and the more temperate forests to the south.  Characteristic trees include Mongolian oak, Basswood, and Ash trees.

Location and description 
The terrain in the ecoregion is mostly low hills and plains.  The west and northern coasts face the colder Sea of Okhotsk.  The ecoregion surrounds the Hokkaidō montane conifer forests ecoregion which is at higher altitudes.

Climate 
The climate of the ecoregion is Humid continental climate, warm summer (Köppen climate classification (Dfb)). Average annual precipitation is 1,150 mm.

Flora and fauna 
Dominant trees of the lowland forests are Mongolian oak (Quercus mongolica), Lime trees (Tilia), and Ash trees (Fraxinus).  The main underbrush is Sasa, a form of dwarf bamboo.  The ecoregion is generally too cold to support the Japanese beech that is common on Honshu to the south.  Biodiversity is relatively low in the area, and there are no endemic species.

References 

Palearctic ecoregions
Ecoregions of Japan
Temperate broadleaf and mixed forests